Lauren Elizabeth Jackson  (born 11 May 1981) is an Australian professional basketball player. The daughter of two national basketball team players, Jackson was awarded a scholarship to the Australian Institute of Sport (AIS) in 1997, when she was 16. In 1998, she led the AIS team that won the Women's National Basketball League (WNBL) championship. Jackson joined the Canberra Capitals for the 1999 season when she turned 18 and played with the team off and on until 2006, winning four more WNBL championships. From 2010 to 2016, Jackson played with the Canberra Capitals, which she did during the Women's National Basketball Association (WNBA) offseason during the time she continued WNBA play.

Jackson made the Australian under-20 team when she was only 14 years old and was first called up to the Australian Women's National Basketball Team (nicknamed The Opals) when she was 16 years old. She was a member of the 2000 Summer Olympics and 2004 Summer Olympics teams and captain of the 2008 Summer Olympics team, winning three silver medals. She was also part of the Australian team that won the bronze at the 2012 Summer Olympics. Jackson was a member of the Australian Senior Women's Team that won a silver medal at the 2002 FIBA World Championship for Women in China, co-captain of the team that won a gold medal at the 2006 Commonwealth Games in Melbourne, and captain of the team that won a gold medal at the 2006 FIBA World Championship for Women in Brazil.

In 2001, Jackson entered the Women's National Basketball Association (WNBA) draft and was selected by the Seattle Storm, which viewed Jackson as a franchise player. She won two WNBA titles with the Storm, in 2004 and 2010, the latter also earning Jackson the WNBA Finals Most Valuable Player Award. Jackson ranks among the top WNBA players in played games, minutes played, field goals, three-point shots, and turnover percentage.

Jackson played club basketball in Europe with WBC Spartak Moscow in Russia and Ros Casares Valencia in Spain. She also played in the Women's Korean Basketball League, where she was named the league's Most Valuable Player and set a league record scoring 56 points, and in the Women's Chinese Basketball Association. Jackson announced her retirement from basketball on 31 March 2016, citing a persistent knee injury as the reason for her decision. Besides her basketball career, Jackson is in the process of attaining her university degree at the Macquarie University, majoring in gender studies.

Jackson was inducted into the Women's Basketball Hall of Fame in 2020. In 2021, Jackson was inducted into the Naismith Memorial Basketball Hall of Fame.

Jackson came out of retirement in April 2022, to play for the Albury Wodonga Bandits in NBL1 East.

Personal life
Lauren Elizabeth Jackson, whose nicknames include "Loz", "Jacko" and "LJ", was born in Albury, New South Wales, on Monday, 11 May, 1981, the oldest of two children of Gary Jackson and his wife Maree Bennie. Both her parents played for Australia's national basketball teams and Jackson inherited her height from both parents. Her father, Gary, played for the Boomers in 1975, while her 6ft 2in mother, Maree, played for the Opals from 1974 to 1982. Bennie played in two World Championships, and for the women's basketball team at Louisiana State in the late 1980s, wearing the number 15, the number Jackson wears in her mother's honour. Bennie was one of the first Australians to play in the American collegiate system, where she was known for her aggressive style of play and was nicknamed "the assassin". Her parents continued to play basketball locally on the social level when Lauren and her brother were young, and her family had a basketball court in their backyard when Jackson was growing up. Her grandfather played for the Western Suburbs Magpies.

Jackson grew up in Albury, where she attended Murray High School. She earned her Higher School Certificate in Canberra while she was training with the Australian Institute of Sport. Jackson studied for a psychology degree at Lomonosov Moscow State University and continued via correspondence from America. In 2007, she was working on a university course in business management.

In 2010, she was taking classes at Macquarie University in Sydney. Her coursework was centred in cultural studies and included topics like women's rights and racism. Injuries have prevented her from studying around 2010, but in 2012, she was back working on her degree, and her aspirations have included becoming a United Nations diplomat. She has also considered becoming an advocate for women. Her interests regarding gender studies were inspired by a book regarding the rape during the Rwandan Genocide, and Jackson is even an ambassador of a foundation that seeks to empower the abused women of that war. By 2015, Jackson was trying to get a Bachelor of Gender and Diversity at the University of Canberra, mostly through distance education.

As a youngster, Jackson was active in other sports. She was involved in athletics at school and played tennis, which she gave up because competitions conflicted with her ability to play basketball. Similarly, she played on her school netball team, until the age of 14, giving it up because of basketball commitments. In the off season, Jackson trains by pumping weights.

She was this tall by the time she turned 16, after she gained  in height when she was 15 years old.

Jackson's first child, Harry Gray, was born in 2017. She had a second child in 2018.

Basketball
Lauren is the most famous basketball player in Australia, a position she reached by 2003. Prior to this, Australia's most famous player was Michelle Timms, who played internationally. She was recognised as one of the world's best basketball players by the time she was 21. She has been described as Australia's best female player to ever step on a basketball court, and the best female basketball player in the world. She has said regarding being the best female basketball player in the world: "I don't really think about it. Nobody really talks to me like that. It's not something I'm conscious of. My family and people who have known me all my life, they see me for who I am, and crack open a beer or a bottle of wine with me. They know I have to train, but the rest of it is really laid-back."

Jackson plays two positions, forward and centre, and has the ability to make jump shots and spinning bank shots.

Early career
Jackson started playing basketball at the Albury Sports Centre when she was four years old. As a six-year-old, she told others that she would one day play for the Australian national team in Basketball. Her mother taught her how to play. She first played competitive basketball as a six-year-old she played on a local under-10 side. Her mother was her coach for two years. This was difficult for both mother and daughter in order to change their personal dynamics. As an 11-year-old, Jackson was not the best player in Albury, but she played in the under-14 Australian Country Championships. Her team made it to the Grand Final one year, and she played in the match despite having hurt her knee. She was upset after the event. In response to this, her parents sat down with her and explained she did not need to continue to play if she did not want to. Following this conversation, she went to her room and typed a message on her computer that said "from this day on, nothing will stand in my way..."

When she was 14 years old, Jackson led her New South Wales side to a national championship gold. Her performance in the tournament attracted the attention of the national team selectors. Tom Maher said of the game: "Right then and there, I said, 'Is this the best thing I've ever seen?' It was just unbelievable. Those old guys had seen a lot of basketball, and they were drooling." As a competitor at the 1999 Australian Under-20 national championships, she won the Bob Staunton Award for the tournament MVP. She was described as a basketball prodigy by the time she was seventeen years old.

Jackson has played with Robyn Maher, Michelle Timms and Shelley Gorman, whom she admired during her youth. They all won bronze medals at the 1996 Summer Olympics. Jackson had a rivalry with American basketball player Lisa Leslie. Both women dislike each other, a dislike that goes back to when Jackson was on tour in the United States with the Opals as a 16-year-old. The rivalry intensified in 2000 at the Olympics in the gold medal match when Jackson purposely pulled off Leslie's hair extension while both were trying to grab a rebound. Jackson treated the incident as a joke, saying "It was something to joke about even though we lost the gold medal." Leslie did not feel the same way about the extension pulling incident. The rivalry continued when Jackson transitioned to the WNBA and her Seattle Storm team played Leslie's Los Angeles Sparks, who at the time were the best team in the league. The rivalry was so intense that their coaches had to coach around it, sometimes choosing to keep one off the floor when the other was on. The coaches feared if they left the players on the floor together, their own player would foul out in an attempt to get the best of the other player. Leslie and Jackson have played together as team members in the WNBA's All-Star game. Their rivalry thawed somewhat by 2007 but they did not become friends.

Women's Korean Basketball League
In 2007, Jackson played in the Women's Korean Basketball League and was named the league's Most Valuable Player. She played for Samsung Bichumi (Samsung Insurance) in Seoul, South Korea. Her stint with the team was only four months, and she was the only international player on the team. She averaged 30.2 points per game. No one else on the team spoke English. Jackson claimed this allowed her to play drama free basketball. In a game with Samsung Bichumi against the Kumho Redwings, she scored 56 to set a league record in her team's 96–76 victory. This was a personal best for her in her career. Two weeks prior to the 56-point record, she scored 47 points in a single game. She competed in the league's all star game and was declared the Most Valuable Player of the match. She played two games a week with the league.

European basketball
Jackson has played club basketball in Europe. She first signed with a European side at the end of the 2005 WNBA season, and went to Russia on a lucrative contract. In 2007, she was paid six figures in American dollars, four times her WNBA base salary, to play with WBC Spartak Moscow Region for one month. Her teammates included other international basketball Olympians: Sue Bird, Diana Taurasi, and Tina Thompson. While playing for the team, she lived in a mansion owned by the team's owner with a view of a nuclear power plant. As a member of the team, she helped Spartak win the 2007 Russian Superleague title. Subsequently, she continued playing for Spartak and won two more Russian Superleague titles with the team, in 2008 and 2009. She scored 35 points in a EuroLeague Women 2008 in an 11 April 2008 game against UMMC Ekaterinburg while playing for Spartak. This was the highest number of points that she scored in a single game in a Euroleague game. Later on, Jackson played for Spartak in the EuroLeague Women finals in Brno, which her team won. She finished the 2008 season with an average of 23.6 points per game and 7.1 rebounds per game.

In 2009, Jackson had an option of extending her contract with Spartak for two more years. First, it looked likely that Jackson would stay with Spartak. However, following the assassination of Shabtai Kalmanovich, the owner of the team, she announced in November 2009 that she would stop playing for the team and not extend her contract She subsequently changed her mind and returned to play with the Spartak in 2010. In the 2009/2010 season games she averaged 15.2 points per game and 5.7 rebounds per game. On 3 December 2010 while playing with Spartak, she was named the EuroLeague Women Player of the Week. Playing in the team's second match against a Kaunas Lithuanian side, she scored 28 points, had two blocks and had five rebounds while playing 31 minutes to lead her team to victory after having missed the first game where her team lost.

In the 2010/2011 season, Jackson played for Spartak, where she averaged 17.3 points per game and 8.4 rebounds per game. She left the team in early January 2011 because of an injury, returning to Australia for her recovery. Part of her treatment involved getting an MRI. According to Jackson, she left Russia for Australia because "I couldn't move, the swelling was very obvious, and the pain was just a little bit too painful. That's when I got home to all these messages and e-mails from people back in Australia who had seen the scans and said 'you need to come back (to Australia) and start your rehab right away'."

She played for the Ros Casares Valencia, Spain, in 2011 and 2012. She joined the team in 2011. It was her first year with a Spanish team. She played in the power forward position with the team. She ranked 16th in the league for three-point field goal shooting percentage at 41.5%. She ranked 17th in the league for three-point field foals made per game at 1.4. In the game against Spartak, she played in a season-high 31 minutes. She missed the game against Galatasaray MP, playing zero minutes. She scored 16 points in a 29 March 2012 game against Sparta&K M.R. Vidnoje, her highest total number of points in a single game in the 2011/2012 season. Casares plays in the Spanish Liga Femenina and the EuroLeague Women. After a February 2012 game, her Spanish team's general manager Carme Lluveras described her performance as perfect. She has not started all games in the 2011/2012 season, coming off the bench on a few occasions because her team was stacked with talent. She was averaging 20 minutes, 8.0 points, and 2.9 rebounds a game as of 10 February 2012. During the 2011/2012 season, she scored 14 points against Bourges, 15 points in an away game against UMMC Ekaterinburg, and six against Galatasaray at a home game. In the game against the Turkish Galatasary, she scored an important three-pointer near the end of the game that helped stop a come-from-behind attempt by the opposition.

WNBA

Seattle viewed Jackson as a franchise player. On the court in the WNBA, she was known for her sharp and stinging comments directed at other players. Opposition players knew they could get at Jackson by giving her sneaky fouls and nettling her back with some trash talk. While playing in the WNBA, she has dyed her hair different colours several times. She ranks 35th in the league for total played games with 308. She has played 9,958 minutes in the league and ranks 16th all time in this category. In her career, she has made 2056 field goals, ranking third all time in this category. She ranked fifth all time in the league with 4,456 field goal attempts. She ranked 34th overall career wise in the league with a field goal percentage of 46.1%. Career wise, she ranks 10th overall for three-point field goals with 430. She attempted 1219 three-point field goals in her career, ranking 10th on the league's all time leaderboard. She was ranked second all time in the league for turnover percentage with 9.4.

2001
In 2001, she was drafted first when she entered the WNBA draft in the fifth year of the league having a draft and was selected by the Seattle Storm. Her parents stayed with her in Seattle for the first month she played in the WNBA in 2001. Jackson's first season included 32 games played over the course of 11 weeks, a much more difficult competition in terms of total games compared to Australia's domestic league. She played in 21 games. She ranked eighth in the league with 406 field goal attempts. In her debut game with the team, she scored 21 points. On 3 July 2001, she set a WNBA record for most minutes played in a single game with 55 in a game against Washington that had four overtime periods. That season, she averaged 15.2 points per game, came in second for the WNBA's Rookie of the Year award. At the end of the first season with the Storm, Jackson required surgery on her right shoulder. She attempted 129 three-point field goals this season, ranking 8th in the league. She had a player efficiency rating of 22.5. She ranked seventh in the league in this category for the season, and was a WNBA All Star.

2002
Jackson was a WNBA All Star again in 2002, and played in the All Star Game. She averaged 17.2 points per game. She was the team's captain, the youngest in the WNBA at the time. During one game which was attended by 11,000 fans, the fans loudly chanted her name. In 2002, Carrie Graf, who had been an assistant coach on the Australian national team from when Jackson for played for it, changed coaching positions in the WNBA from Phoenix to Seattle specifically to make Jackson feel more comfortable playing for the team. She was estimated to have earned $200,000 to play for the Storm in 2002.

In the second game of the 2002 final series against the Los Angeles Sparks, Jackson's scored only four points in a loss by her team, after being kneed in the groin by Lisa Leslie. In 2002, she only earned one technical foul the whole season. Her mother spent two weeks in Seattle with Jackson during this season. At the end of the second season with the Storm, she had severe pain as a result of shin splints. Jackson and Sue Bird first played together this season and would continue to play together for the Storm into the 2010 season. During the 2002 season, Jackson's team got into a fight when they played the Los Angeles Sparks.

In the 2002 season, Jackson played in 28 games, averaging 31.5 minutes per game. She averaged 2.9 blocks per game,. and attempted 120 three-point field goals this season, ranking 10th in the league. She ranked second in the league with 462 field goal attempts, and made 186 field goals, ranking 6th in the league in this category. She had a player efficiency of 24.5. She ranked fourth in the league in this category this season. She was ranked first in the league for turnover percentage with 8.6.

2003
Jackson was a WNBA All Star again in 2003, and was named to the 2003 All-WNBA First Team. This season, she averaged 21.2 points per game. By the end of the season, she had scored 1,000 points in the league, the youngest player to date to score that many points in the league. She was named the league's MVP, and was one of the top five women in the league for average number of rebounds per games and blocks per game. She called Tom Maher and her Seattle Storm coach Anne Donovan after winning the award, and cried for an hour after learning she won. She was the first non-American to be named the league's MVP and the youngest player to earn this honour.

In the 2003 season, Jackson played in 33 games, averaging 33.6 minutes per game. She averaged 1.9 blocks per game. She ranked first in the league for field goals, with 254, for total points with 698, for field goal attempts with 526, and for win shares with 9.2, and offensive win shares with 6.7. She also ranked first in the league with 21.2 points per game average, and had a player efficiency of 32.1, likewise ranking first in the league, and led the league with win share per 48 minutes with 40.0%. She ranked third in the league with a field goal percentage of 48.3%, and for total minutes played with 1,109.

2004
In 2004, her Seattle Storm team won the WNBA Championship. She was again named to the 2004 All-WNBA First Team. This season, she averaged 20.5 points per game. She played in 31 games, averaging 34.5 minutes per game. She averaged 2.0 blocks per game. She made 220 field goals and ranked second in the league in this category. She ranked fourth in the league with 460 field goal attempts. She ranked seventh in the league with a field goal percentage of 47.8%, and her three-point field goal shooting percentage was 45.2%, ranking third in the league. She ranked first in the league for total points with 634, and for points per game with 20.52 points on average, and had a player efficiency of 28.0, second in the league in this category. She ranked third in the league with a true shooting percentage of 59.0%, and ranked first in the league for offensive win shares with 6.1.

2005
Jackson was a WNBA All Star again in 2005, and was named to the 2005 All-WNBA First Team. This season, she played in 34 games, averaging 34.6 minutes per game. She averaged 17.6 points per game, and 2.0 blocks per game. She ranked third in the league for her 34 total games, and for her 206 field goals. She ranked fifth in the league for total minutes played with 1,176, and for field goal attempts, with 450. She attempted 118 three-point field goals this season, ranking eighth in the league, and was ranked first for total defensive rebounds with 217. She had a player efficiency of 26.7. She ranked first in the league in this category this season. She was also ranked first in the league for turnover percentage with 10.0, in the offensive rating category with 117.6, for offensive win shares with 6.0, for win shares with 8.2, and with win share per 48 minutes with 33.3%.

2006
Jackson was still with the Seattle Storm in 2006, coached by Anne Donovan. She was a WNBA All Star again in 2006, and was named to the 2006 All-WNBA First Team. In 2006, she was named to the WNBA All-Decade Team. Jackson of this said "That was cool. It was brilliant to be recognised like that in America. It's a tough, emotionally draining lifestyle there but it's fun." She ranked first in the league with the number of free throws with 170.

This season, she averaged 19.5 points per game, she played in 30 games, averaging 28.4 minutes per game. She averaged 1.7 blocks per game. She made 193 field goals and ranked seventh in the league. She ranked second in the league with a field goal percentage of 53.5% She had a player efficiency of 34.9, and ranked first in the league in that category that season.

She ranked first in the league with a true shooting percentage of 65.8%. In effective field goal percentage, she finished first in the league with 57.5%. She ranked first in the league in the offensive rating category with 135.3. She ranked first in the league for offensive win shares with 7.4. She ranked first in the league for win shares with 8.8. She ranked first in the league with win share per 48 minutes with 50.0%. At the end of the season, she had stress fractures in both of her shins, and her team exited the post season before making it to the league championship series.

In 2006, she was also inducted into the AIS's 25 Best of the Best program.

2007
Jackson was a WNBA All Star for the sixth time in 2007. On 24 July 2007, she scored 47 points in a game against Washington and set a league high single game scoring total that she currently shares. In 2007, she was named the WNBA Defensive Player of the Year. She was also named to the 2007 All-WNBA First Team. She averaged 23.8 points per game, the most points she had averaged per game for a season in the WNBA. She was also named the league's Most Valuable Player. In voting, she received 473 points, with her nearest vote-getting competitor, Becky Hammon, getting only 254. In 2007, she became the first WNBA player to score 4,000 total points the youngest player, as well as the fastest woman to reach the milestone; being named the league MVP gave her a $18,238 bonus and a Tiffany & Co. designed trophy.

Jackson played in 31 games in 2007. She averaged 32.9 minutes per game. Her field goal percentage was 51.9%. She averaged 22.4 points, 2.16 blocks, and 9.3 rebounds per game at the time of the All-Star Break, leading the league in points and blocks, and was second for rebounds. At the All-Star break, she had a three-point shooting percentage of 40.5%. At the end of the season, she expressed an interest in ending her WNBA career with the Storm as she could not see herself playing elsewhere. Her three-point field goal percentage was 40.2%. She had a free throw shooting percentage of 88.3%. She averaged 2.0 blocks per game. She made 258 field goals, ranking second in the league in this category. She ranked third in the league with 497 field goal attempts. She ranked third in the league, with a field goal percentage of 51.9%. She ranked first in the league in defensive rebounds, with 220, for total rebounds, with 300, and for total average number of rebounds per game, with 9.7.

Jackson had a player efficiency rating of 35.0, ranking first in the league in this category this season. She ranked first in the league with a true shooting percentage of 63.3%. In effective field goal percentage, she finished first in the league, with 56.8%. She was also ranked first in the league for turnover percentage, with 8.8, for her offensive rating category of 127.7, for offensive win shares with 7.9, win shares with 9.5, and win share per 48 minutes with 44.6%. In all, she finished the season ranked in the top ten players in no less than twenty-eight different statistical categories.

2008
In 2008, Jackson averaged 20.2 points per game. In July 2008, she scored 33 points for the Seattle Storm in an 84–71 win against Washington. This was her season-high scoring high. On the same day she was officially named to the 2008 Australian Olympic squad, and the Seattle Storm went out of the post season in the first round. In 2008, she played in 21 games. She averaged 33.1 minutes per game. Her field goal percentage was 45.2%, and her three-point field goal percentage was 29.5%. She had a free throw shooting percentage of 93.4%, averaged 1.6 blocks per game, and had a player efficiency of 26.7, ranking third in the league in this category this season.

2009
In 2009, Jackson became a WNBA All Star for the seventh time and was named to the 2009 All-WNBA First Team. This season, she averaged 19.4 points per game. She played in 26 games, in which she averaged 32.3 minutes per game. Her field goal percentage was 46.3%. Her three-point field goal percentage was 43.0%, she had a free throw shooting percentage of 79.7%, and her three-point field goal shooting percentage was 43.0%, ranking fifth in the league. Her player efficiency was 26.1, the highest efficiency of any player that season, and her win share of 33.3% per 48 minutes was the highest also.

2010
Jackson played for the WNBA All-Stars at the Stars at the Sun game in 2010, and her Seattle Storm team won the WNBA Championship. She was named to the 2010 All-WNBA First Team. This season, she averaged 20.5 points per game. On 2 September 2010, Jackson was presented her third MVP Award at the Seattle Storm's Game 1 of the Western Conference Finals against the Phoenix Mercury. On 17 September 2010, the Storm beat the Atlanta Dream to win the WNBA championship for the second time. Jackson was named the finals MVP. In 2011, she was voted in by fans as one of the Top 15 players in the fifteen-year history of the WNBA.

Jackson played in 32 games. She averaged 31.0 minutes per game, with a field goal percentage of 46.2%, and a three-point field goal percentage of 34.6%. She had a free throw shooting percentage of 91.0%, She made 220 field goals, ranking sixth in the league, and ranked fifth in the league with 476 field goal attempts. She attempted 156 three-point field goals this season, ranking eighth in the league. She had a player efficiency of 27.9, ranking first in the league in this category this season. She also ranked first in the league in the offensive rating category with 126.3, for offensive win shares with 6.1, for win shares with 8.3, and for win share per 48 minutes with 40.0%. In the locker room, Jackson would talk to her teammates about topics like women's rights and Lady Gaga.

2011
In 2011, Jackson had to deal with a number of injuries that kept her out for most of the season. She injured her hip in a game against the Tulsa Shock, and had surgery for it on 30 June. That season, she played in only 13 games. She missed 20 games in a season that is 34 games long. After she came back from her surgery, her team won 8 out of her first 9 games. She averaged 24.9 minutes per game. Her field goal percentage was 39.6%, her three-point field goal percentage was 31.1%, and had a free throw shooting percentage of 88.4%. In June 2011, she signed a three-year contract with the team.

2012
Jackson opted to sit out the early part of the 2012 season as she wanted to concentrate on making the national team and competing in the Olympics. She returned in September and helped the Storm in two blowout wins against the Tulsa Shock, but then an injury sustained during the Olympic preparations sidelined Jackson for three games. Upon her return on 21 September, Jackson became the fourth WNBA player to reach 6,000 points. Jackson wound up playing just 167 minutes on the regular season. The Storm saw an early playoff exit in their series against the Minnesota Lynx, with Jackson attempting a buzzer beater in the third game but falling short. This turned out to be Jackson's final game in the WNBA.

2013–retirement
A hamstring surgery forced Jackson out of the 2013 season, and she also missed the 2014 season after operating both her right knee and left Achilles in February. The final year of her Storm contract was suspended in 2013 and dissolved under the new collective-bargaining agreement signed in 2014, but Seattle still retained Jackson's rights. During her 2014 recovery, Jackson expressed interest in returning to Seattle in 2015, saying that despite so much time sidelined by injury, "I've just had too good of a career there to let that fall by the wayside." However, these hopes of returning to the WNBA and the Storm for the 2015 season were sidelined when Jackson had further surgery on her right knee in the spring of 2015. Her attentions turned to the 2016 Summer Olympics in Rio de Janeiro. However, in November 2015, Jackson announced that her rehabilitation had suffered a setback that would keep her from practising until January 2016. Upon taking the court again, she stated she would decide in February 2016 if she would participate in what would be her fifth Olympic games or retire from the sport. Her retirement was announced one month later.

WNBA career statistics

Regular season

|-
| style="text-align:left;"| 2001
| style="text-align:left;"| Seattle
| 29 || 29 || 34.5 || .367 || .310 || .727 || 6.7 || 1.5 || 1.9 || 2.2 || 1.83 || 15.2
|-
| style="text-align:left;"| 2002
| style="text-align:left;"| Seattle
| 28 || 28 || 31.5 || .403 || .350 || .756 || 6.8 || 1.5 || 1.1 || 2.9 || 1.68 || 17.2
|-
| style="text-align:left;"| 2003
| style="text-align:left;"| Seattle
| 33 || 33 || 33.6 || .483 || .317 || .825 || 9.3 || 1.9 || 1.2 || 1.9 || 2.09 || style="background:#D3D3D3"|21.2°
|-
|style="text-align:left;background:#afe6ba;"| 2004
| style="text-align:left;"| Seattle
| 31 || 31 || 34.5 || .478 || .452 || .811 || 6.7 || 1.6 || 1.0 || 2.0 || 2.06 || style="background:#D3D3D3"|20.5°
|-
| style="text-align:left;"| 2005
| style="text-align:left;"| Seattle
| 34 || 34 || 34.6 || .458 || .288 || .834 || 9.2 || 1.7 || 1.1 || 2.0 || 1.74 || 17.6
|-
| style="text-align:left;"| 2006
| style="text-align:left;"| Seattle
| 30 || 30 || 28.3 || .535 || .377 || .899 || 7.7 || 1.6 || 0.8 || 1.7 || 1.33 || 19.5
|-
| style="text-align:left;"| 2007
| style="text-align:left;"| Seattle
| 31 || 31 || 32.9 || .519 || .402 || .883 || style="background:#D3D3D3"|9.7° || 1.3 || 1.0 || 2.0 || 1.81 || style="background:#D3D3D3"|23.8°
|-
| style="text-align:left;"| 2008
| style="text-align:left;"| Seattle
| 21 || 21 || 33.0 || .452 || .295 || .934 || 7.0 || 1.2 || 1.5 || 1.6 || 1.90 || 20.2
|-
| style="text-align:left;"| 2009
| style="text-align:left;"| Seattle
| 26 || 26 || 32.4 || .463 || .430 || .797 || 7.0 || 0.8 || 1.5 || 1.7 || 1.65 || 19.2
|-
|style="text-align:left;background:#afe6ba;"| 2010†
| style="text-align:left;"| Seattle
| 32 || 32 || 31.0 || .462 || .346 || .910 || 8.3 || 1.2 || 0.9 || 1.2 || 1.44 || 20.5
|-
| style="text-align:left;"| 2011
| style="text-align:left;"| Seattle
| 13 || 13 || 24.8 || .396 || .311 || .884 || 4.9 || 0.3 || 1.0 || 0.8 || 1.31 || 12.2
|-
| style="text-align:left;"| 2012
| style="text-align:left;"| Seattle
| 9 || 9 || 24.8 || .425 || .311 || .720 || 4.9 || 0.3 || 1.0 || 0.8 || 1.30 || 12.2
|-
| style="text-align:left;"| Career
| style="text-align:left;"|12 years, 1 team
| 317 || 317 || 31.9 || .460 || .351 || .842 || 7.7 || 1.4 || 1.1 || 1.8 || 1.74 || 18.9

Postseason

|-
| style="text-align:left;"| 2002
| style="text-align:left;"| Seattle
| 2 || 2 || 34.0 || .346 || .000 || .714 || 5.0 || 1.5 || 1.5 || 3.0 || 2.00 || 11.5
|-
|style="text-align:left;background:#afe6ba;"|  2004†
| style="text-align:left;"| Seattle
| 8 || 8 || 35.9 || .469 || .727 || .897 || 7.5 || 1.4 || 1.0 || 1.1 || 2.00 || style="background:#D3D3D3"|19.6°
|-
| style="text-align:left;"| 2005
| style="text-align:left;"| Seattle
| 3 || 3 || 34.0 || .436 || .308 || .833 || 8.0 || 0.7 || 1.3 || 1.3 || 2.67 || 14.3
|-
| style="text-align:left;"| 2006
| style="text-align:left;"| Seattle
| 3 || 3 || 30.3 || .536 || .286 || .917 || 8.0 || 0.7 || 0.7 || 2.3 || 1.67 || 18.0
|-
| style="text-align:left;"| 2007
| style="text-align:left;"| Seattle
| 2 || 2 || 34.0 || .565 || .300 || 1.000 || style="background:#D3D3D3"|11.5° || 0.5 || 1.0 || 1.5 || 2.50 || 19.0
|-
|style="text-align:left;background:#afe6ba;"|  2010†
| style="text-align:left;"| Seattle
| 7 || 7 || 36.1 || .465 || .314 || .836 || style="background:#D3D3D3"|9.6° || 1.1 || 1.7 || 1.4 || 1.86 || 21.6
|-
| style="text-align:left;"| 2011
| style="text-align:left;"| Seattle
| 3 || 3 || 27.3 || .382 || .385  || .700 || 3.7 || 0.3 || 0.3 || 1.3 || 1.33 || 15.0
|-
| style="text-align:left;"| 2012
| style="text-align:left;"| Seattle
|  3|| 3 || 30.3 || .278 || .273 || .700 || 7.7 || 1.0 || 1.1 || 1.5 || 0.33 || 10.0
|-
| style="text-align:left;"| Career
| style="text-align:left;"|8 years, 1 team
| 31|| 31 || 33.6 || .443 || .376 || .841 || 7.8 || 1.0 || 1.1 || 1.5 || 1.81 || 17.5

WNBL
The Women's National Basketball League (WNBL) was founded the year Jackson was born. Between 1998 and 2008, she played a total of 154 WNBL games, winning one championship with the Australian Institute of Sport (AIS) and four more with the Canberra Capitals.

Jackson was offered a scholarship with the AIS in 1996, when she was just 15, but her parents said no to this, as it required her to move from Albury to Canberra. The next year, she accepted a scholarship. The programme considers her one of its success stories. With Jackson leading a side composed of the best 16- to 17-year-old development players in the country, the Australian Institute of Sport WNBL team won the WNBL Championship.

Jackson joined the Canberra Capitals for the 1999 season when she turned 18, and played with the team off and on until 2006. While with the team, she won four WNBL championships. In 1999/2000, the Canberra Capitals who won the league championship in a finals match against Adelaide where they had a final score of 67–50.

She played for the Canberra Capitals for the 2002/2003 season. In a November game in Penrith with a temperature of  against the Sydney Flames, 500 people largely showed up to watch her play. This season, she was coached by Carrie Graf. In the Penrith game, she scored 9 of the Capital's first 13 points. She finished the game with 29 points, 16 rebounds and 5 blocks, with her team winning 79–67. In a December 2002 against the Australian Institute of Sport, she scored 33 points. After home games in Canberra, Jackson would hang out with her teammates at Tilley's Devine Cafe.

In a December 2002 game against the Townsville Fire in Townsville was moved to the Townsville Entertainment and Convention Centre, which seated 5,000 people instead of at the Fire's normal 800-seat stadium, because it was felt Jackson would draw that large a crowd. She did, with 4,110 people showing up to the game and setting a regular season attendance record for the Fire. Canberra lost the match, with Townsville figuring a way to contain Jackson, limiting her to 23 points, which was six below her average of 29 points per game so far in that the season. At the time, the attendance was the best ever for a regular season WNBL game, with only two Grand Finals games in the post season having more people in attendance.

She played with the Capitals in the Women's World Cup 2003 where she averaged 30.6 points per game and 11.4 rebounds. She also won the WNBL Grand Final as a member of the Capitals, and was named the Most Valuable Player in the Grand Finals match. During the 2003/2004 season, she scored 48 points in a single October 2003 game. This was her highest individual game point total at the time and is her single highest WNBL point scoring game.

Jackson returned to the Capitals for the last half of the 2009/2010 season. The Capitals started an effort to re-sign Jackson, and in March 2011, she signed a contract for a million dollars to play in the WNBL. This was the most an Australian woman had ever been offered to play for a domestic side in the country, with most of the top women earning only $50,000 a year. Despite returning to Australia and being present at every Capitals game, injuries prevented Jackson from playing in the 2012–13 NBDL season. For the 2013–14 season, the Capitals missed the deadline date to sign Jackson and led her to play in China instead. Jackson was signed for the Capitals' next two seasons, and expected to join the team in November 2014, after recovering from a hip surgery she went through in September. Jackson's return happened in 19 December against the Adelaide Lightning. Jackson managed to play five more games in the 2014–15 WNBL season, losing only one as she averaged 13 points and seven rebounds. Still her physical ailments prevented Jackson from training with her teammates, and requiring weekly drainings of synovial fluid out of her knee. During a double-header road trip in Victoria, Jackson's knee gave in. A subsequent MRI scan showed further damage to her knee that required new surgeries, forcing Jackson to sit out the rest of the season. The Capitals released Jackson from her contract in January 2016.

China 2013
After missing the 2013 WNBA season and with a deal with Canberra Capitals falling through, in September 2013 Jackson signed with the Heilongjiang Shenda of the Women's Chinese Basketball Association. She helped Heilongjiang qualify to the playoffs with an average of 22 points, 9.5 rebounds and 1.8 steals per game, but a heel injury made Jackson lose the post-season. Another injury during the season, where Jackson "pulled my meniscus out of the root of my bone" was not deemed too grave at the time, but the knee problems would escalate during the following years.

National team

Jackson made the Australian under-20 team when she was only 14 years old. She was first called up to the senior national team when she was 16 years old. Her national team coaches Tom Maher and Carrie Graf say positive things about Jackson to the press and others but they rarely have said those things to Jackson. This is a strategy designed to help motivate Jackson to play better. Tom Maher who was the coach her called her up said "She's so good she could be the greatest sportswoman in the world. She's that extraordinary." Graf has described Jackson as one of the superstars of the game.

Jackson was a member of the 1997 Australian Junior Women's Team that won a silver medal at the World Championships in Brazil. At the time, she was 16 years old. She averaged 14.3 points per game and 9.9 rebounds per game. She was also a member of the 1998 Australian Senior Women's Team that won a bronze medal at the World Championships in Germany. At the time, she was 16 years old and the youngest Australian woman ever to be named to the team. In the tournament, she averaged 10.9 points per game and 3.9 rebounds per game. She was a key part of the team's success. She was coached in the tournament by Tom Maher. She came off the bench to play.

In the Olympic test tournament in the lead up to the 2000 Summer Olympics, Jackson scored 18 points and 10.7 rebounds per game. She was a member of the 2000 Summer Olympics team that won a silver medal. At the 2000 Games, she scored 127 total points, had 23 total blocked shots, 12 steals and 67 rebounds. She averaged 15.9 points and 8.4 rebounds per game. In the 76–54 loss in the gold medal game, she scored 24 points and had 13 rebounds. She led the team in points scored and total rebounds. Going into the Olympics, her team was ranked third in the world. At the Sydney Games, she was coached by Tom Maher. The gold medal final was against the United States.

Jackson was a member of the Australian Senior Women's Team that won a silver medal in the World Championships in China in 2002. She averaged 23.1 points a game in the competition and was named to the All-Star team for the tournament. She averaged 5.4 rebounds per game. In a semi-final match against the United States, Jackson fouled Lisa Leslie three times in the first six minutes of the game. The team lost while Jackson spent most of the time on the bench. By January 2003, Jackson had played over 100 games with Australia's senior side. She competed in the 2003 World Championships and was named the International Basketball Federation's Most Valuable Player. At the FIBA Diamond Ball Tournament for Women 2004, she averaged 22.7 points and 14.0 rebounds per game.

Jackson was a member of the Australian senior team that won a silver medal at the 2004 Summer Olympics, where she averaged 22.9 points and 10.0 rebounds per game. The gold medal final was against the United States. In 2006, she was a co-captain with Jenny Whittle of the Australian women's senior team that won a gold medal at the Commonwealth Games. She played in the preliminary final against the Mozambique women's national basketball team, and the gold deal match against New Zealand. Jackson was the captain of the Australian women's senior team that won a gold medal at the World Championships in Brazil in 2006 that beat Russia in the Gold Medal match. This was the first time Australia had ever earned gold in the event. Jackson averaged 21.3 points and 8.9 rebounds per game. While the national team is called The Opals, Jackson asked Basketball Australia if they were to make rings for team members in honour of their win, if they would use diamonds instead of opals.

As captain of the 2008 Summer Olympics Australian women's team that won a silver medal at the Olympics, Jackson averaged 17.3 points and 8.6 rebounds per game. In the FIBA Diamond Ball Tournament for Women 2008, Jackson averaged 20.3 points per game and 5.0 rebounds per game. In 2010, she was a member of the senior women's national team that competed at the World Championships in the Czech Republic. She averaged 13.4 points per game and 7.9 rebounds per game.

Jackson missed the first training camp for the 2012 Summer Olympics squad in March, but was back by April to train with the team. In June, Jackson tore her adductor magnus muscle during the Australian training camp in the Czech Republic. She was one of the models for the 2012 Australian Olympic team uniforms, and chosen to carry the Australian Flag during the Opening Ceremony for the 2012 Olympic Games. The hamstring injury prevented Jackson from getting much play during the Olympic tournament, having only had significant court time in the matches against USA and the bronze medal play-off with Russia.

After flying to Australia in February 2014 to operate on her heel and knee, Jackson committed to return to the Opals in time for the 2014 FIBA World Championship for Women. However, the delayed recovery of Jackson's knee led her to give up on the tournament to have her right hip operated on to fix a torn labrum in September 2014. She had gotten the tear while playing for Ros Casares Valencia in 2012 but went without surgery to not miss the then-upcoming Olympics. Jackson would later express interest in attending her fifth Olympic tournament during the 2016 Summer Olympics as a way to close her career, while also pursuing her long-standing dream of a gold medal. However, while attending the Opals training camp in Canberra, she announced her retirement saying her conditions were not improved enough and she needed an "absolute miracle" to get into shape.

Post-retirement
After retiring in 2016, Jackson had previously expressed interest in becoming a basketball administrator, saying that "Where I put my time and energy is now crucial. I want to get involved in the political side of sport rather than the media and I need to learn from the people who have been there before." She now heads the women's division of Australian Basketball Alliance, a new trade union for basketballers formed in 2015. A main pursuit of hers is getting tertiary education for all players. In May 2016, Jackson joined the new ownership group of the Melbourne Boomers, being named the team's commercial operations executive. Jackson also served as a colour commentator for Channel Seven's broadcast of the Olympic tournament.

She released an autobiography, My Story: A Life in Basketball and Beyond, in October 2018.

Return to basketball

In April 2022, Jackson came out of retirement at the age of 40, to play for the Albury Wodonga Bandits in NBL1 East. That August, she was named to the Australia squad for the 2022 FIBA Women's Basketball World Cup, to be held from 22 September to 1 October in Sydney. Australia went on to win the bronze medal, with Jackson recording 30 points and 7 rebounds in their victory over Canada.

In August 2022, Jackson signed up with the Southside Flyers for the 2022–23 WNBL season. A February 2023 game against the Sydney Flames set a WNBL record crowd of 7,681 spectators due to the interest in Jackson's participation; however during the game an Achilles injury put Jackson out for the rest of the season.

Health issues
Jackson has had multiple injuries. In 2008, after the Olympics, she had surgery to fix her ankle. In 2009, she had two stress fractures in her back. In December 2010, she had an Achilles injury. She sustained the injury playing in Australia. Between January 2011 and February 2012, she had surgeries to assist with Achilles and hip injuries. She had surgery on her left hip acetabular labrum in June 2011 in Vail, Colorado at the Richard Steadman Clinic. She said of the surgery: "This is a really, really tough decision, but after talking with my doctors and my family, we felt that immediate surgery is the best course of action. With something painful like this hip injury, I want to be especially proactive. I plan to stay in Seattle to be here with my team and try my best to be back on the court as soon as possible. My goal is to be at full strength by the end of the season." She did rehabilitation twice a day in an attempt to speed her recovery. Afterwards, Jackson injured her right knee, requiring more surgery in 2012. Another knee injury while playing in China in 2014 degraded into arthritis, and her knee required much surgical intervention during the following years, including a long hospitalisation in January 2016 after her knee joint suffered a postsurgical infection. All the consequences of this knee problem led to Jackson's first retirement from pro basketball in March 2016. During her WNBL return in 2022, Jackson played several games with a broken foot before a tear in her right Achilles ended her season in February 2023.

Jackson has expressed interest in undergoing a knee reconstruction, as "I don't want to walk with a limp for the rest of my life."

Celebrity
By 2003, Jackson was being recognised around the world from countries like Portugal and Japan. She said of her private life: "I don't really have a private life. I've found it difficult as an athlete, to maintain a relationship. It's not one of my best points but I've got family and friends who compensate for that. When I was younger I went out and had a lot of fun, and there were moments when people criticised me for that, and you know what, I'm young, I'm going to do that, and anyone who is going to get on me for that ... I really didn't care." She does not like to go out to clubs because she gets recognised by too many people, and everyone wants to comment on her height. She partied a fair amount in her early 20s. By 2010, she was not able to stay out at night clubs until 5:30 am any more because she lacked the stamina.

In response to getting a hug from Yao Ming at the 2008 Summer Olympics during the closing ceremonies, internet rumours started that Jackson and the married Yao were romantically involved. These rumours were incorrect. Jackson said of them: "When we came across this Yao Ming thing it was like, 'Oh...My...God! When I tell you we were in hysterics...because anybody who knows me knows that would be the last thing on my mind. A 7-foot 6 Chinese man? That's just not my thing. I really respect him as a player. And people who know me know I can be wild and over-the-top. I'm affectionate and that night I guess I was affectionate with the wrong person. I guess the Chinese people don't do that stuff very often, so the cultural [differences] was a big thing. But I don't care. You have to laugh about things or you'll be crying, which I would probably have been doing anyway [because of the loss and surgery]. I made the most of my last night at the Olympics and had a great time."

When people google Jackson, some of the first search results feature her in the nude. Jackson said of this: "Instead of being known for my basketball skills, all of these nudie shots are always the first thing you see." She posed nude in an Australian magazine, Black+White, that featured Olympic athletes who were set to compete in Athens in the 2004 Summer Olympics. The expensively printed magazine/book has been produced for the last three Olympic Games and, by the 2004 edition, was considered uncontroversial in Australia with its "artistic" approach to nude photography, and its equal coverage of male and female athletes, although it did create a stir in the United States. She also posed for the 2005 edition of the Sports Illustrated Swimsuit Issue. Of posing nude, she said, "if offered the opportunity, I think that it's a personal decision. Whether you do it for the money or whatever, again, I think it's a personal decision. I don't know whether I would say yes or no. I guess you cross that bridge when you come to it. I don't think it's a bad thing, I'm not against it."

As Jackson got older, she took on a more activist role, working for domestic violence charities and helping children from Australia's outback get involved in sport. In December 2002, she helped launch the Smith Family Toy Drive at the Canberra Centre with the help of Ainslie school children. She is the patron for the NSW Rape Crisis Centre. She is passionate about preventing domestic abuse. In 2010, she visited young basketball players at Batemans Bay's Moruya Basketball.

Honours
Jackson was named the Australian International Player of the year in 1999, 2000 and 2002. In 2005, she was inducted into the Australian Institute of Sport 'Best of the Best'. In late 2011, the Albury Sports Stadium was renamed the Lauren Jackson Sports Centre. A thousand people showed up at the renaming ceremony, at which Jackson was the guest of honour.

She was the flag bearer for Australia at the Summer 2012 London Olympic Games. On 8 June 2015, she was appointed an Officer of the Order of Australia in the Queen's Birthday Honours.

Jackson was inducted into the Women's Basketball Hall of Fame in 2020, the same year in which she was inducted into the Sport Australia Hall of Fame. The following year, she was inducted into the Naismith Memorial Basketball Hall of Fame and was named to The W25, the WNBA's 25th anniversary team.

Inaugural inductee to University of Canberra Sport Walk of Fame in 2022.

See also

 List of Australian WNBA players

References

External links

 
 
 
 

1981 births
Living people
Articles containing video clips
Australian expatriate basketball people in China
Australian expatriate basketball people in Russia
Australian expatriate basketball people in Spain
Australian expatriate basketball people in the United States
Australian expatriate basketball people in South Korea
Australian Institute of Sport basketball (WNBL) players
Australian women's basketball players
Basketball players with retired numbers
Basketball players at the 2000 Summer Olympics
Basketball players at the 2004 Summer Olympics
Basketball players at the 2006 Commonwealth Games
Basketball players at the 2008 Summer Olympics
Basketball players at the 2012 Summer Olympics
Canberra Capitals players
Centers (basketball)
Commonwealth Games gold medallists for Australia
Commonwealth Games medallists in basketball
Heilongjiang Dragons players
Medalists at the 2000 Summer Olympics
Medalists at the 2004 Summer Olympics
Medalists at the 2008 Summer Olympics
Medalists at the 2012 Summer Olympics
Officers of the Order of Australia
Olympic basketball players of Australia
Olympic bronze medalists for Australia
Olympic medalists in basketball
Olympic silver medalists for Australia
People educated at Lake Ginninderra College
Sportspeople from Albury
Ros Casares Valencia players
Seattle Storm draft picks
Seattle Storm players
Sport Australia Hall of Fame inductees
Sportswomen from New South Wales
Women's Korean Basketball League players
Women's National Basketball Association All-Stars
Women's National Basketball Association first-overall draft picks
University of Canberra alumni
Medallists at the 2006 Commonwealth Games